Otrada is a rural locality (a settlement) in Oktyabrsky Selsoviet, Zmeinogorsky District, Altai Krai, Russia. The population was 149 as of 2013. There are 2 streets.

Geography 
Otrada is located 48 km northwest of Zmeinogorsk (the district's administrative centre) by road. Oktyabrsky is the nearest rural locality.

References 

Rural localities in Zmeinogorsky District